The 1993–94 season was Colchester United's 52nd season in their history and their second consecutive season in the fourth tier of English football, the Third Division. Alongside competing in the Third Division, the club also participated in the FA Cup, the League Cup and the Football League Trophy.

Following a 10th-placed finish the previous campaign, Colchester's defensive frailties were clear as they shipped 71 goals, the second-highest in the league and ended the season in 17th. They crashed out of the FA Cup to non-League opposition in Sutton United, while Fulham saw off the U's in the first round of the League Cup. In the Football League Trophy, Colchester progressed to the southern section quarter-final but were eliminated by old Conference rivals Wycombe Wanderers.

Season overview
Following a campaign of goalkeeping uncertainty where the U's employed six different 'keepers over the course of the season, finding a regular starter between the sticks was key for manager Roy McDonough. With youth team product Nathan Munson on the books, McDonough brought in John Keeley from Oldham Athletic in the summer. However, his performances did not convince and he played his final game for the club in November 1993. This meant a string of mid-season transfers and loans of goalkeepers into the club, and the U's ended the season having once again used six different goalkeepers. McDonough even found himself in goal in October 1993 when facing Hereford United after Keeley and substitute Munson were both sent off for professional fouls. The U's went on to lose that game 5–0. Colchester were the first Football League club to have two goalkeepers sent off in the same fixture. Hereford striker Chris Pike scored a hat-trick in the game, with each of his goals coming against three different goalkeepers.

The fans frustration at the defensive performances came to a head in the FA Cup first round. The U's found themselves 2–0 down at home to non-League side Sutton United, before goals from Steve McGavin and Steve Brown levelled the score at 2–2 early in the second half. Sutton struck again in the 84th minute, before Tony English equalised two minutes later. Despite their best efforts, two-minutes from time, Ollie Morah scored the winner for Sutton to send them into the second round.

The financial situation was bleak. There were no funds to bring in a permanent goalkeeper, and striker Steve McGavin was sold to Birmingham City for £150,000 in January. Again, no funds were made available for a replacement. It took a consortium of local businessmen to raise £10,000 to buy Steve Whitton from Ipswich Town on deadline day to fill the gap. As such, the U's ended the season in a disappointing 17th-position in Division Three.

There was an early exit from the League Cup as Fulham beat Colchester over two legs in the first round, while in the Football League Trophy, the U's progressed from the first round group stage, then beat Wrexham in the second round, before falling to defeat in the southern section quarter-final at home to Wycombe Wanderers, who won 1–0.

Roy McDonough was handed a silver salver by chairman Gordon Parker on the last day of the season in recognition of McDonough's 500th career appearance. Three days later it was Parker, McDonough's father-in-law, that sacked him.

Players

Transfers

In

 Total spending:  ~ £20,000

Out

 Total incoming:  ~ £0

Loans in

Match details

Third Division

Results round by round

League table

Matches

League Cup

Football League Trophy

FA Cup

Squad statistics

Appearances and goals

|-
!colspan="14"|Players who appeared for Colchester who left during the season

|}

Goalscorers

Disciplinary record

Clean sheets
Number of games goalkeepers kept a clean sheet.

Player debuts
Players making their first-team Colchester United debut in a fully competitive match.

See also
List of Colchester United F.C. seasons

References

General
Books

Websites

Specific

1993-94
English football clubs 1993–94 season
1993–94 Football League Third Division by team